International Conference on Advances in ICT for Emerging Regions (ICTer) is the successor to the seminal International Information Technology Conference (IITC) held in Sri Lanka since 1998. It provides a platform where research done in ICT is presented by both local and foreign Computer Scientists and IT Professionals. In order to get wider international participation and to promote computing research in the fast-emerging regions of the world especially in Asia-Pacific, it was decided to broadbase the IITC conference and link it with the related International Journal ICTer (www.icter.org).

Overview
The conference is attended by about 200 researchers and students each year. Topics of interest have included Technology, Applications, Human-Computer Interaction, Development Processes, and Social, Legal and Ethical Issues. The conference usually includes pre-conference and/or post-conference high-quality tutorials/workshops in areas of current interest in Information and Communication Technology.

The conference was initiated to mark the year of IT declared by the Government of Sri Lanka in 1998. Initially, it was organised by the Infotel Lanka Society and managed by the Council for Information Technology (CINTEC). Management was taken over by the University of Colombo School of Computing (UCSC) in 2003. Infotel Lanka Society organised by conference until 2006. Currently, the UCSC organise and manage the conference.

Conferences

Management 
University of Colombo School of Computing
35, Reid Avenue
Colombo 00700
Sri Lanka

See also 
 List of computer science conference acronyms

References

External links 
  ICTer Conference web page.

Computer science conferences
Academic conferences